The politics of Brunei take place in a framework of an absolute monarchy, whereby the Sultan of Brunei is both head of state and head of government (prime minister of Brunei).  
Executive power is exercised by the government.  Brunei has a legislative council with 36 appointed members, that hold consultative powers only.

Regime stability
Brunei is the only ruling monarchy in Southeast Asia and as of 2023, Brunei is one of seven monarchic dictatorships in the world. Although about half of monarchic dictators suffer serious consequences such as death and imprisonment, Brunei is lauded as one of the most stable dictatorships and states, no less. Due to their rarity, the outcomes of monarchic dictatorships are not well studied and through preference falsification, contentment with the Bruneian sultan and government may be overestimated, but up to this point, there are no known organized or small-scale efforts against the ruling government. Due to high oil revenue, Brunei has been able to provide extensive social services to its population, including free education and health care. Welfare provision is a strong method for the Bruneian regime to exercise nonviolent political control, as citizens are reliant on the state both for employment and social services. Brunei’s exhaustive provision of welfare raises the cost of protest and constitutes a means to maintain credible commitment. Brunei derives regime stability and legitimacy from a combination of welfare and religious authority through the national philosophy “Melayu Islam Beraja.”

Political power
Under Brunei's 1959 constitution, His Majesty Hassanal Bolkiah, is the head of state with full executive authority, including emergency powers since 1962. The sultan's role is enshrined in the national philosophy known as "Melayu Islam Beraja", or Malay Islamic monarchy. The country has been under martial law since a rebellion occurred in the early 1960s and was put down by British troops from Singapore.

Executive branch

The sultan is the head of state and head of government in Brunei, exercising absolute powers and full executive authority under the framework of the 1959 constitution. The sultan is advised by and presides over five councils:  the privy council, council of succession, religious council, council of ministers, and legislative council.

Privy council
According to the constitution, the privy council advises the sultan in the matters concerning the exercise of authority of mercy and the amendment or revocation of provisions in the constitution. The council also advises the sultan on the conferring of Malay customary ranks, titles and honours. It also performs functions such as proclaiming a succession of regency. Members of the privy council include members of the royal family and senior government officials.

Council of succession
The council of succession determines succession to the throne should that need arise. The order of succession is determined by the constitution.

Religious council
The religious council, known in full as the Brunei Islamic Religious Council advises the sultan on all matters pertaining to Islam. The body in charge of Islamic administration policy. Policies determined by the council are executed by the ministry of religious affairs.

Members of the religious council include government ministers, a pengiran cheteria, pehin manteris, state mufti, the attorney general, the syarie chief justice and additional members appointed by the sultan.

Council of ministers

A council of ministers, or cabinet, which currently consists of nine members (including the sultan, as prime minister), perform the day-to-day administrative functions of government.

Legislative branch 

Under the 1959 constitution  there was an elected legislative council, but only one election has ever been held, in 1965. Soon after that election, the assembly was dissolved following the declaration of a state of emergency, which saw the banning of the Brunei People's Party. In 1970 the council was changed to an appointed body by decree of the sultan. In 2004 the sultan announced that for the next parliament, 15 of the 20 seats would be elected. However, no date for the election has been set.

Since 13 January 2017, the council has 33 members, including 13 cabinet ministers.

List of Brunei political parties 
Although there are no elections, the following legal party exists:
 National Development Party
Former parties include:
 Brunei National Solidarity Party
 Brunei People's Awareness Party
 Brunei National Democratic Party
 Brunei People's Party

See also 
Culture of Brunei
Politics of Oman
Politics of Saudi Arabia

References

External links
 Government of Brunei Darussalam official website

 

bn:ব্রুনাই#রাজনীতি